Eglon may refer to:

Eglon, Canaan, a biblical city
Eglon (king), a biblical king
Eglon, West Virginia, a community in the U.S. state of West Virginia
Eglon, Washington, a community in the U.S. state of Washington on the Kitsap Peninsula